Charles F. Snyder  (1873–1901) was a Major League Baseball outfielder and catcher.

External links

Major League Baseball outfielders
Major League Baseball catchers
Philadelphia Athletics (AA) players
19th-century baseball players
1873 births
1901 deaths
Baseball players from Camden, New Jersey
Reading (minor league baseball) players
Lebanon (minor league baseball) players
Easton (minor league baseball) players
York White Roses players
Philadelphia Colts players
Indianapolis Hoosiers (minor league) players